Sparbanken Arena may refer to one of the following places:
 Sparbanken Lidköping Arena, a sports arena in Lidköping, Sweden
 Sparbanken Skåne Arena, a sports arena in Lund, Sweden
 Sparbanken Arena, a sports arena in Arboga, Sweden.